The 2009 NCAA Division I men's ice hockey tournament involved 16 schools playing in single-elimination play to determine the national champion of men's NCAA Division I college ice hockey as the culmination of the 2008–09 season. The tournament began on March 27, 2009, and ended with the championship game on April 11.

Boston University, coached by Jack Parker, won its fifth national title (and first since 1995) with a 4–3 overtime victory in the championship game over Miami University, coached by Enrico Blasi. The game marked the thirteenth time the NCAA championship game has gone to overtime and the first since Minnesota's win over Maine in 2002.

Colby Cohen, sophomore defenseman for Boston University, scored the championship-winning goal in overtime and was named the Frozen Four's Most Outstanding Player.

Tournament procedure

The 2009 NCAA Men's Division I Ice Hockey Championship was a single-elimination tournament featuring 16 teams representing all six Division I conferences in the nation. The Championship Committee seeded the entire field from 1 to 16 within four regionals of 4 teams. The winners of the six Division I conference championships received automatic bids to participate in the NCAA Championship.

In setting up the tournament, the Championship Committee sought to ensure "competitive equity, financial success and likelihood of playoff-type atmosphere at each regional site." A team serving as the host of a regional was placed within that regional. The top four teams were assigned overall seeds and placed within the bracket such that the national semifinals would feature the No. 1 seed versus the No. 4 seed and the No. 2 seed versus the No. 3 seed had the top four teams have won their respective regional finals. Number 1 seeds were also placed as close to their home site as possible, with the No. 1 seed receiving first preference. Conference matchups were avoided in the first round; should five or more teams from one conference have made the tournament, this guideline may have been disregarded in favor of preserving the bracket's integrity.

The four regionals were officially named after their geographic areas. The following were the sites for the 2009 regionals:
March 27 and 28
East Regional, Arena at Harbor Yard – Bridgeport, Connecticut (Hosts: Yale University and Fairfield University)
West Regional, Mariucci Arena – Minneapolis, Minnesota (Host: University of Minnesota)

March 28 and 29
Midwest Regional, Van Andel Arena – Grand Rapids, Michigan (Hosts: Central Collegiate Hockey Association and Western Michigan University)
Northeast Regional, Verizon Wireless Arena – Manchester, New Hampshire (Host: University of New Hampshire)

Each regional winner advanced to the Frozen Four:
April 9 and 11
Verizon Center – Washington, D.C. (Hosts: United States Naval Academy and the Greater Washington Sports Alliance)

Qualifying teams
The at-large bids and seeding for each team in the tournament were announced on March 22, 2009. The Central Collegiate Hockey Association (CCHA) and Hockey East each had four teams receive a berth in the tournament, while ECAC Hockey and the Western Collegiate Hockey Association (WCHA) each had three teams receive a berth, and Atlantic Hockey and College Hockey America (CHA) each had one team receive a berth.

Preliminary rounds
The number in parentheses denotes overall seed in the tournament.
(*) denotes overtime period(s).

East Regional – Bridgeport, Connecticut

Regional semifinals

Regional final

Northeast Regional – Manchester, New Hampshire

Regional semifinals

Regional final

West Regional – Minneapolis, Minnesota

Regional semifinals

Regional final

Midwest Regional – Grand Rapids, Michigan

Regional semifinals

Regional final

Frozen Four – Verizon Center, Washington, DC

National semifinals

National championship

Record by conference

Media

Television
ESPN had US television rights to all games during the tournament. For the fifth consecutive year ESPN aired every game, beginning with the regionals, on ESPN, ESPN2, ESPNU, ESPN Classic and ESPN360.

Broadcast Assignments
Regionals
East Regional: Justin Kutcher, Damian DiGiulian, & Ken Hodge – Bridgeport, Connecticut
West Regional: Clay Matvick & Jim Paradise – Minneapolis, Minnesota
Midwest Regional: Ben Holden & Sean Ritchlin – Grand Rapids, Michigan
Northeast Regional: John Buccigross & Barry Melrose – Manchester, New Hampshire

Frozen Four & Championship
Gary Thorne, Barry Melrose, & Clay Matvick – Washington, DC

Radio
Westwood One used exclusive radio rights to air both the semifinals and the championship, AKA the "Frozen Four.
Sean Grande & Cap Raeder

All-Tournament Team

East Regional

All-East Regional Team
Goaltender: Andrew Volkening (Air Force)
Defensemen: Greg Flynn (Air Force), Dan Lawson (Vermont)
Forwards: Sean Bertsch (Air Force), Jacques Lamoureux (Air Force), Viktor Stalberg (Vermont)

MOP
Dan Lawson (Vermont)

Northeast Regional

All-Northeast Regional Team
Goaltender: Kieran Millan (Boston University)
Defensemen: Matt Gilroy (Boston University), Kevin Kapstad (New Hampshire)
Forwards: Nick Bonino (Boston University), Jason Lawrence (Boston University), Peter Leblanc (New Hampshire)

MOP
Jason Lawrence (Boston University)

West Regional

All-West Regional Team
Goaltender: Cody Reichard (Miami)
Defensemen: Evan Oberg (Minnesota-Duluth), Cameron Schilling (Miami)
Forwards: Mike Connolly (Minnesota-Duluth), Justin Mercier (Miami), Brett Wilson (Princeton)

MOP
Justin Mercier (Miami)

Midwest Regional

All-Midwest Regional Team
Goaltender: Matt Dalton (Bemidji State)
Defensemen: Ryan Adams (Bemidji State), Brad Hunt (Bemidji State)
Forwards: Evan Barlow (Cornell), Matt Read (Bemidji State), Tyler Scofield (Bemidji State)

MOP
Tyler Scofield (Bemidji State)

Frozen Four
G: Kieran Millan (Boston University)
D: Colby Cohen* (Boston University)
D: Kevin Roeder (Miami)
F: Nick Bonino (Boston University)
F: Colin Wilson (Boston University)
F: Tommy Wingels (Miami)
* Most Outstanding Player(s)

References

Tournament
NCAA Division I men's ice hockey tournament
NCAA Division I Men's Ice Hockey Tournament
NCAA Division I Men's Ice Hockey Tournament
NCAA Division I Men's Ice Hockey Tournament
NCAA Division I Men's Ice Hockey Tournament
NCAA Division I Men's Ice Hockey Tournament
NCAA Division I Men's Ice Hockey Tournament
NCAA Division I Men's Ice Hockey Tournament
2000s in Minneapolis
Events in Grand Rapids, Michigan
Ice hockey competitions in New Hampshire
Ice hockey competitions in Bridgeport, Connecticut
Ice hockey competitions in Michigan
Ice hockey competitions in Minneapolis
Ice hockey competitions in Washington, D.C.
Sports in Manchester, New Hampshire
Sports in Grand Rapids, Michigan